Civic Democratic Party may refer to:

Civic Democratic Party (Bosnia and Herzegovina), a political party in Bosnia
Civic Democratic Party (Czech Republic), a political party in the Czech Republic
Civic Democratic Party (Slovakia), former Slovak wing of the party in Czechoslovakia
Civic Democratic Party (Hungary), a political party in Hungary
Civic Democratic Party (Lithuania), a political party in Lithuania
Conservative Democratic Party of Switzerland, a political party in Switzerland whose name translates literally to 'Civic Democratic Party'